Alberto Canlas (born March 11, 1940) is a Filipino weightlifter. He competed in the men's bantamweight event at the 1960 Summer Olympics.

References

1940 births
Living people
Filipino male weightlifters
Olympic weightlifters of the Philippines
Weightlifters at the 1960 Summer Olympics
People from Caloocan
20th-century Filipino people